WWE Wal3ooha (WWE ولعوها) is a television program produced by WWE originally broadcast on OSN Sports in the United Arab Emirates every Thursday at 9:00 PM, which features recaps of Monday Night Raw and Friday Night SmackDown as well as exclusive interviews with WWE wrestlers and personalities. The show's title translates to “light it up” and is the first WWE program to feature original and localized content intended exclusively for the Middle East and North Africa market.

In October 2018 the show also began airing on MBC Action.

Hosts

See also
List of current WWE programming
Crew

 Producers : Dhawal Darji & Nidal Mora
 Editor: Dhawal Darji
 Executive Producer: Phil Rostom
 Director: Nidal Morra
 Story Producer: Dhawal Darji
 Vision Mixer: Amine

References

Arabic-language television shows
Arabic television series
Television series by WWE
WWE international
2017 Emirati television series debuts